Christopher John Skilton (born 19 March 1955) is a former Archdeacon of Croydon and Archdeacon of Lambeth.

He was educated at Magdalene College, Cambridge and ordained in 1981. After curacies at Ealing and Wimborne he became Team Vicar of St Paul's Great Baddow. From 1995 to 2003 he was the Team Rector of Sanderstead.

He was collated Archdeacon of Croydon at Southwark Cathedral on 14 April 2013; he retired effective 29 February 2020.

References

1955 births
Alumni of Magdalene College, Cambridge
Archdeacons of Croydon
Archdeacons of Lambeth
Living people